Berlin Botanischer Garten (in German Bahnhof Berlin Botanischer Garten) is a railway station in the Lichterfelde locality of Berlin, Germany, named after the nearby Botanical Garden. It is served by the Berlin S-Bahn and several local bus lines.

References

External links
Station information 

Berlin S-Bahn stations
Railway stations in Berlin
Buildings and structures in Steglitz-Zehlendorf